Duttaphrynus silentvalleyensis, also known as the Silent Valley toad or South Indian hill toad, is a species of toad endemic to Kerala, southern India. The type specimen was collected near or in the Silent Valley National Park. It may be a synonym of Duttaphrynus parietalis.

References

silentvalleyensis
Frogs of India
Endemic fauna of the Western Ghats
Fauna of Kerala
Amphibians described in 1981